Salvatore Esposito (born 2 February 1986, Naples) is an Italian actor. He is best known for his leading role as Gennaro "Genny" Savastano on the Sky Italia television series Gomorrah (2014–2021). In 2020, Esposito made his English-language debut by appearing in the 4th season of the American TV series Fargo.

Filmography

Films

Television

References

External links

Living people
Italian male film actors
Italian male television actors
1986 births